Homeobox protein Emx2 is a protein that in humans is encoded by the EMX2 gene.

Function 
The homeodomain transcription factor EMX2 is critical for central nervous system and urogenital development. EMX1 (MIM 600034) and EMX2 are related to the 'empty spiracles' gene expressed in the developing Drosophila head.[supplied by OMIM].

The EMX2 gene encodes for a transcription factor that is a homolog to Drosophila melanogaster “empty spiracles” gene. The “empty spiracles gene” is needed for the proper head development/formation as well as the development of posterior spiracles in Drosophila melanogaster.

In humans, EMX2 shows high expression in the dorsal telencephalon, olfactory neuroepithelium, as well as the urogenital system. In the developing uroepithelium, EMX2 is negatively regulated by HOXA10. EMX2 has been associated with Schizencephaly, a disease where there are large parts of the brain hemispheres absent and that are replaced with cerebrospinal fluid, clinical observations can include seizures, blindness, and inability to walk/speak. EMX2 has also been shown to have an important role in tumorigenesis. One study found that the expression of EMX2 is significantly decreased in tissues and cells with colorectal cancer. It is suspected that EMX2 could be used as a treatment of colorectal cancer.

See also 
 EMX1

References

Further reading

External links 
 

Transcription factors